Clark County is a county located in the west central portion of the U.S. state of Ohio. As of the 2020 census, the population was 136,001. Its county seat and largest city is Springfield. The county was created on March 1, 1818, and was named for General George Rogers Clark, a hero of the American Revolution.

Clark County comprises the Springfield, OH Metropolitan Statistical Area, which is also included in the Dayton-Springfield-Sidney-OH Combined Statistical Area.

Geography
It is the third-smallest county in Ohio by total area.

Adjacent counties
Champaign County (north)
Madison County (east)
Greene County (south)
Montgomery County (southwest)
Miami County (west)

Demographics

2000 census
As of the census of 2000, there were 144,742 people, 56,648 households, and 39,370 families living in the county. The population density was 362 people per square mile (140/km2). There were 61,056 housing units at an average density of 153 per square mile (59/km2). The racial makeup of the county was 88.12% White, 8.95% Black or African American, 0.28% Native American, 0.53% Asian, 0.02% Pacific Islander, 0.53% from other races, and 1.58% from two or more races. 1.17% of the population were Hispanic or Latino of any race. 23.8% were of German, 21.6% American, 10.4% Irish and 8.7% English ancestry according to Census 2000.

There were 56,648 households, out of which 31.40% had children under the age of 18 living with them, 52.60% were married couples living together, 12.80% had a female householder with no husband present, and 30.50% were non-families. 26.00% of all households were made up of individuals, and 11.10% had someone living alone who was 65 years of age or older. The average household size was 2.49 and the average family size was 2.97.

In the county, the population was spread out, with 25.10% under the age of 18, 9.10% from 18 to 24, 26.80% from 25 to 44, 24.30% from 45 to 64, and 14.70% who were 65 years of age or older. The median age was 38 years. For every 100 females there were 92.50 males. For every 100 females age 18 and over, there were 88.60 males.

The median income for a household in the county was $40,340, and the median income for a family was $48,259. Males had a median income of $37,157 versus $24,688 for females. The per capita income for the county was $19,501. About 7.90% of families and 10.70% of the population were below the poverty line, including 14.90% of those under age 18 and 8.20% of those age 65 or over.

2010 census
As of the 2010 United States Census, there were 138,333 people, 55,244 households, and 36,906 families living in the county. The racial makeup of the county was 86.3% white, 8.8% black or African American, 0.6% Asian, 0.3% American Indian, 1.4% from other races, and 2.5% from two or more races. Those of Hispanic or Latino origin made up 2.8% of the population. In terms of ancestry, 25.3% were German, 15.0% were Irish, 13.8% were American, and 10.5% were English.

Of the 55,244 households, 31.1% had children under the age of 18 living with them, 47.5% were married couples living together, 14.1% had a female householder with no husband present, 33.2% were non-families, and 27.7% of all households were made up of individuals. The average household size was 2.45 and the average family size was 2.96. The median age was 40.5 years.

The median income for a household in the county was $44,141 and the median income for a family was $53,678. Males had a median income of $43,209 versus $30,811 for females. The per capita income for the county was $22,110. About 11.1% of families and 15.9% of the population were below the poverty line, including 24.5% of those under age 18 and 7.4% of those age 65 or over.

Metropolitan Statistical Area
The Springfield metropolitan area was first defined in 1950. Then known as the Springfield Standard Metropolitan Area (Springfield SMA), it consisted of a single county – Clark – and had a population of 111,661. Following a term change by the Bureau of the Budget (present-day Office of Management and Budget) in 1959, the Springfield SMA became the Springfield Standard Metropolitan Statistical Area (Springfield SMSA). By the census of 1960, the population had grown to 131,440, an 18 percent increase over the previous census. Champaign County was added to the Springfield SMSA in 1973. The two-county area had a combined population of 187,606 in 1970.

In 1983, the official name was shortened to the Springfield Metropolitan Statistical Area (Springfield MSA). That same year, Dayton and Springfield were grouped together as the Dayton-Springfield Metropolitan Statistical Area. The new MSA consisted of four counties – Clark, Greene, Miami, and Montgomery. This arrangement remained unchanged until 2003, when the MSA was split with Springfield's newly defined metropolitan area including only Clark County.

Politics
Clark County has voted Republican in every presidential election since 2004 with Donald Trump receiving 57% of the vote in 2016, a deviation from the usual tight results in the county. In 2012, Mitt Romney won the county, but by only 523 votes out of 64,301 cast for president.

County Commissioners - Rick Lohnes (R), Melanie Flax Wilt (R) and Lowell McGlothlin (R)

Sheriff - Deb Burchett (R)

Recorder - Nancy Pence (R)

Treasurer - Stephen Metzger (D)

Auditor - John Federer (R)

Prosecuting Attorney - Dan Driscoll (R)

Coroner - Richard Marsh, MD (D)

Judicial

Municipal Court

Clerk of Courts - Guy Ferguson (D)

Judges - Denise Moody (R), Stephen A. Schumaker (R), Thomas Trempe (D)

Common Pleas Court

Clerk of Courts - Melissa Tuttle (R)

General Division - Judges Douglas Rastatter (R) and Richard O'Neil (D)

Domestic Relations - Judge Thomas Capper (R)

Juvenile Court - Judge Joseph Monnin (D)

Probate - Judge Richard Carey (R)

|}

Education

Public school districts
Clark - Shawnee Local School District
 Shawnee High School, Springfield (the Braves)
 Greenon Local School District
 Greenon High School, Springfield (the Knights)
 Northeastern Local School District
 Kenton Ridge High School, Springfield (the Cougars)
 Northeastern High School, Springfield (the Jets)
 Northwestern Local School District
 Northwestern High School, Springfield (the Warriors)
 Southeastern Local Schools
 Southeastern High School, South Charleston (the Trojans)
 Springfield City School District
 Springfield High School, (the Wildcats)
 Tecumseh Local School District
 Tecumseh High School, New Carlisle (the Arrows)

Colleges and Universities
Clark State College
Clark State College, Springfield (the Eagles)
Wittenberg University
Wittenberg University, Springfield (the Tigers)

Communities

Cities
New Carlisle
Springfield (county seat)

Villages

Catawba
Clifton
Donnelsville
Enon
North Hampton
South Charleston
South Vienna
Tremont City

Townships

Bethel
German
Green
Harmony
Mad River
Madison
Moorefield
Pike
Pleasant
Springfield

Census-designated places
Crystal Lakes
Green Meadows
Holiday Valley
Northridge
Park Layne

Unincorporated communities

 Beatty
 Brighton
 Cortsville
 Dialton
 Dodo
 Dolly Varden
 Durbin
 Eagle City
 Harmony
 Hustead
 Lawrenceville
 Limestone City
 Lisbon
 Locustgrove
 Medway
 New Moorefield
 Pitchin
 Plattsburgh
 Selma
 Sugar Grove
 Villa

See also
Clark County Public Library
Clark County Heritage Center
National Register of Historic Places listings in Clark County, Ohio

References

External links
Official web site of Clark County
Guide to Clark County from the Guardian newspaper of London

 
1818 establishments in Ohio
Populated places established in 1818